The Ingolstadt Dukes are a German American football team from Ingolstadt, Bavaria.

The club, formed in 2007, experienced its greatest success in 2016 when it won promotion to the German Football League, the top tier of league football in Germany.

History
The Ingolstadt Dukes were formed on 8 October 2007 at the club house of TV 1861 Ingolstadt, which became the parent organisation for the American football club. The early seasons of the new club were spent in nearby Manching as the Dukes were unable to secure a permanent home in Ingolstadt.

The Dukes first season, in 2008, was spent in the tier eight Aufbauliga Bayern where it finished fourth and last in its division. It spent the following year in the Landesliga Bayern where it finished first and remained unbeaten all season. The club rose to the Verbandsliga for 2010, won this league, too, and played in the Bayernliga in 2011. After another league title there the Dukes entered the tier three Regionalliga Süd from 2012. Three seasons at this level followed in which the club improved season by season.

In 2014, the Dukes won the Regionalliga, remaining unbeaten throughout and earned promotion to the German Football League 2 for the first time after a play-off victory over Regionalliga Mitte runners-up Langen Knights. The team finished second in the southern division of the GFL2 in 2015.

In 2016, the Dukes made their step to the German Football League.

At the end of their first season, 2017, the Dukes ranked 4th. In the playoff-quarterfinal the Dukes lost against Braunschweig Lions.

Logo and name
The club's logo results from the cities car number plates which start with In. The club's name, the Dukes, comes from the fact that Ingolstadt was once the capital of the Duchy of Bavaria-Ingolstadt.

Honours
 GFL
 Play-off qualification: 2017
 League membership: 2017–present
 GFL2
 Champions: 2016, 2022
 Regionalliga Süd
 Champions: 2014, 2021
 Bayernliga
 Champions: 2011
 Verbandsliga Bayern-Süd
 Champions: 2010
 Landesliga Bayern
 Champions: 2009

Recent seasons
Recent seasons of the Dukes:

 PR = Promotion round.
 QF = Quarter finals.

References

External links
  Official website
  German Football League official website
  Football History Historic American football tables from Germany

American football in Bavaria
German Football League teams
American football teams in Germany
American football teams established in 2007
2007 establishments in Germany
Dukes